Ha VL is a Vietnamese restaurant in Portland, Oregon. The restaurant serves soups, including pho.

Ha (Christina) Luu and William Vuong opened Ha VL in 2004. Rose VL Deli is a "sister" restaurant.

Reception
In 2019, Michael Russell of The Oregonian called the restaurant "one of America’s most celebrated Vietnamese soup destinations". He included Ha VL in the newspaper's 2020 list of the city's 40 best inexpensive restaurants.

In 2017, the restaurant's Luu was nominated in the Best Chef Northwest category of the James Beard Foundation Awards. Ha VL was nominated in the Outstanding Restaurant category in 2020.

See also

 List of Vietnamese restaurants

References

External links
 Ha & VL Sandwich and Soup at Zomato

2004 establishments in Oregon
Powellhurst-Gilbert, Portland, Oregon
Restaurants established in 2004
Vietnamese restaurants in Portland, Oregon